Alhassan Brimah (born 9 November 1937) is a Ghanaian boxer. He competed in the men's light middleweight event at the 1960 Summer Olympics. At the 1960 Summer Olympics, he lost by knockout to Boris Lagutin of the Soviet Union in the Round of 16.

References

External links
 

1937 births
Living people
Ghanaian male boxers
Olympic boxers of Ghana
Boxers at the 1960 Summer Olympics
Boxers from Accra
Light-middleweight boxers